KALT-FM (106.5 FM) is a radio station broadcasting a Classic rock format. Licensed to Alturas, California, United States. The station is currently owned by Woodrow Michael Warren.

References

External links

ALT-FM
Classic rock radio stations in the United States
Alturas, California
Radio stations established in 1990
1990 establishments in California